Senior man is a position held in some collegiate universities by the head of a college's junior common room (JCR, the undergraduate student body). It is the equivalent of 'president'. The senior man acts as the chief representative of the student body, as a figurehead for the JCR and as an elected official. He or she is also responsible for leading the JCR's executive council.

Although terminology refers to the position as a senior 'man', a woman may also fill this role. This reflects the history of these colleges, which were founded as single sex male-only institutions.

The position of senior man is in use at three colleges of Durham University:
 University College
 Hatfield College
 St Chad's College, (the term 'Senior Woman' is also used in this college)

References

Student culture
Durham University